A single father is a male single parent.

Single Father may also refer to:
"Single Father" (song), a 2003 single
Single Father (TV series), a 2010 BBC television serial